Todd Gray may refer to:

 Todd Gray (chef), executive chef and co-owner of Equinox, a restaurant in Washington, D.C.
 Todd Gray (artist) (born 1954), contemporary artist
 Todd Gray (historian), historian of the county of Devon, England